Louis James Kelcher (born August 23, 1953) is an American retired professional football player who was a defensive tackle in the National Football League (NFL), spending most of his career with the San Diego Chargers. He was a four-time All-Pro and a three-time Pro Bowl selection. Kelcher was inducted into the Chargers Hall of Fame and is a member of their 40th and 50th anniversary teams.

Kelcher played college football with the SMU Mustangs and earned consensus All-American honors as a senior in 1974. He was selected by the Chargers in the second round of the 1975 NFL Draft. His outstanding performance made him one of the team's most popular players from 1975 through 1983. He joined the San Francisco 49ers in 1984 and helped them win Super Bowl XIX that season.

Early life
Growing up in Beaumont, Texas, Kelcher was more interested in playing baseball, even though youngsters in Texas who were big typically played football. He was supposed to be eight years old to play peewee league. However, Kelcher was bigger than his peers, and the Little League president next door got him in a year early. He started playing football in junior high school. Entering high school at Beaumont French, he was only interested in playing baseball, but the coaches placed him in football.

College career
Kelcher attended Southern Methodist University, where he played for the Mustangs. As a senior in 1974, he was named National College Lineman of the Week by the Associated Press after recording 16 unassisted tackles and assisting on eight others in an 18–14 win over No. 5 Texas A&M. He was named a consensus All-American and voted the Southwest Conference's defensive player of the year.

NFL career
Kelcher was known for his immense size. He was selected by the San Diego Chargers in the second round of the 1975 NFL draft and was named to the NFL All-Rookie team. In nine seasons (1975–1983) with the Chargers, Kelcher was selected to three Pro Bowls (1977, 1978 and 1980), twice as a starter. He was named All-AFC in 1977, 1978 and 1980; first-team All-Pro in 1977 and 1978; and second-team All-Pro in 1980 and 1981. His teammates voted him the Chargers' most valuable player in 1977, when he helped the team set a then-team record of 44 sacks. He was the first defensive tackle in the team's history to win the award.

Kelcher was sidelined in 1979 for all but three minutes after a knee operation. He returned in 1980, teaming with fellow 1975 Chargers' draftees Fred Dean and Gary "Big Hands" Johnson as the Chargers led the NFL in sacks (60).  Johnson and Dean were named first-team All-Pro, with Kelcher being named second-team All-Pro.  The trio, along with Leroy Jones formed a defensive frontline that was nicknamed the Bruise Brothers. In the 1980 AFC Championship Game against the Oakland Raiders, Kelcher has 20 tackles, 10 solo and 10 assisted, and also one sack. In the Epic in Miami, the 1981 divisional playoff which became one of the greatest football games ever, the Dolphins were leading 38–31 in the fourth quarter and threatening to score again at the Chargers' 20 when Kelcher stripped the ball from Miami's Andra Franklin and San Diego's Pete Shaw recovered the fumble. The Chargers rallied to force overtime and won 41–38. Don "Air" Coryell's Chargers teams of that era are mostly remembered for its high-scoring, pass-oriented offense.  The Chargers made four consecutive playoffs (1979–1982), winning three straight AFC West titles (1979–1981) and advancing to back-to-back AFC championship games.

Kelcher retired in November 1983, but remained on the Chargers reserve list. The Chargers traded him to the San Francisco 49ers in March 1984. Kelcher had wanted to play again, but not with San Diego. The trade reunited him with former Charger teammates Johnson, Dean and offensive lineman Billy Shields. In his final NFL season that year, the 49ers won Super Bowl XIX.

Legacy

Kelcher was a favorite among Chargers fans, who greeted him at home games with cheers of "Loueeee". Chargers quarterback Dan Fouts called him "the most universally beloved guy on our team." Kelcher was among the first NFL defensive linemen to weigh . He was inducted into the Chargers Hall of Fame in 2003, and the Breitbard Hall of Fame in 2006. He was also named to both the Chargers' 40th and 50th anniversary teams.

Kelcher received first-team honors on the All-Southwest Conference football team of the 1970s, and he was inducted into the Southern Methodist University Hall of Fame in 2012.

Later years
Kelcher moved to Austin, Texas, in 1992. He became co-owner with Doug English, a former college rival with the Texas Longhorns, in the warehousing firm Pro Line Warehouse and Distribution. Kelcher also had a stake in a trucking business in Texas.

References

 

1953 births
Living people
People from Beaumont, Texas
All-American college football players
American football defensive linemen
SMU Mustangs football players
San Diego Chargers players
San Francisco 49ers players
American Conference Pro Bowl players